The 2023 UEFA Under-19 Futsal Championship qualifying competition will be a men's under-19 futsal competition to determine the seven teams joining the automatically qualified hosts Croatia in the 2023 UEFA Under-19 Futsal Championship final tournament. Players born on or after 1 January 2004 are eligible to participate.

Teams
Apart from Croatia, a total of 35 (out of 54) UEFA member national teams entered the qualifying stage. They are seeded on the basis of the associations' results in the 2018/19 and 2021/22 competitions.

The 25 highest-ranked teams entered the main round, while the 10 lowest-ranked teams entered the preliminary round. The coefficient ranking was also used for seeding in the preliminary round and main round draws, where each team was assigned a seeding position according to their ranking for the respective draw.

Format
In the preliminary round and main round, each group is played as a round-robin mini-tournament at the pre-selected hosts.

Tiebreakers
In the preliminary round and main round, teams are ranked according to points (3 points for a win, 1 point for a draw, 0 points for a loss), and if tied on points, the following tiebreaking criteria are applied, in the order given, to determine the rankings (Regulations Articles 14.01 and 14.02):
Points in head-to-head matches among tied teams;
Goal difference in head-to-head matches among tied teams;
Goals scored in head-to-head matches among tied teams;
If more than two teams are tied, and after applying all head-to-head criteria above, a subset of teams are still tied, all head-to-head criteria above are reapplied exclusively to this subset of teams;
Goal difference in all group matches;
Goals scored in all group matches;
Penalty shoot-out if only two teams have the same number of points, and they met in the last round of the group and are tied after applying all criteria above (not used if more than two teams have the same number of points, or if their rankings are not relevant for qualification for the next stage);
Disciplinary points (red card = 3 points, yellow card = 1 point, expulsion for two yellow cards in one match = 3 points);
UEFA coefficient for the qualifying round draw;

Preliminary round
The winners of each group advance to main round to join the 27 teams which receive byes to main round.

Times are CET (UTC+1), as listed by UEFA (local times, if different, are in parentheses).

Group A

Group B

Group C

Main round
The winners of each group advance to the final tournament.

Times are CET/CEST, as listed by UEFA (local times, if different, are in parentheses).

Group 1

Group 2

Group 3

Group 4

Group 5

Group 6

Group 7

Qualified teams
The following eight teams qualify for the final tournament.

1 Bold indicates champions for that year. Italic indicates hosts for that year.

References

Notes

External links

qualification
2022–23 in European futsal
2023 in youth association football